Sir Ernest Nigel Ryder,  (born 9 December 1957) became a Lord Justice of Appeal in April 2013 and was appointed Senior President of Tribunals in September 2015. In July 2020, Ryder became the Master of Pembroke College, Oxford.

Education and family life
Ryder was educated at Bolton School and Peterhouse, Cambridge, and worked for the merchant bank, Grindley Brandt & Co 1979-81, before qualifying as a barrister.

He married Janette Martin in 1990, and they have one daughter.

In January 2014, he was installed as Chancellor of the University of Bolton.

Career
Ryder was called to the Bar in 1981 and was appointed Queen's Counsel in 1997. He became a Recorder in 2000, and a Deputy High Court Judge in 2001. Ryder was appointed a High Court judge in 2004, receiving the customary knighthood, and was allocated to the Family Division. On 9 April 2013, he was promoted Lord Justice of Appeal, consequently being sworn of the Privy Council.

Ryder was appointed to the post of Judge in Charge of Modernisation of Family Justice in November 2011, and under his stewardship published the Judicial Proposals for the modernisation of family justice in July 2012.  Many of the recommendations were implemented by the Children and Families Act 2014, including a 26-week time limit for determination of care and supervision proceedings.

In July 2015 it was announced that Ryder had been appointed  Senior President of Tribunals with effect from 18 September 2015. He retired from that role on 19 September 2020 

He was appointed as a Trustee of the Nuffield Foundation in September 2014.

Military
Ryder has served as a Territorial Army officer in the Duke of Lancaster's Own Yeomanry (later Royal Mercian and Lancastrian Yeomanry) and received the Territorial Decoration in 1996.

Notable Cases
Ryder was lead counsel for a respondent mother in the leading domestic violence child contact order case, Re LVNH (Children) (Contact: Domestic Violence) [2001]

Ryder was Counsel to the North Wales Tribunal of Inquiry 1996-99.

References

1957 births
Living people
Alumni of Peterhouse, Cambridge
Masters of Pembroke College, Oxford
British King's Counsel
English barristers
Family Division judges
Knights Bachelor
Lords Justices of Appeal
People educated at Bolton School
Deputy Lieutenants of Greater Manchester
Members of the Privy Council of the United Kingdom
Royal Mercian and Lancastrian Yeomanry officers
Duke of Lancaster's Own Yeomanry officers